Grindstone (local English name, officially Cap-aux-Meules) is a former village municipality located on Grindstone Island in Quebec's Magdalen Islands. The previous municipal government was, on 1 January 2002, incorporated into the urban agglomeration of the Les Îles-de-la-Madeleine municipality.

The community and the island derives its name from Cap aux Meules, a headland on the island.

The sheltered port of Cap-aux-Meules is an important fishing harbour, as well as a commercial cargo and ferry port.  The ferry company, Coopérative de Transport Maritime et Aérien (CTMA) operates a seasonal ferry service to Souris, Prince Edward Island, as well as a year-round cargo service to Matane and Montreal, Quebec.

Communities in Gaspésie–Îles-de-la-Madeleine
Magdalen Islands
Former municipalities in Quebec
Populated places disestablished in 2002